View from the Quai d'Orsay is a mid-19th century painting by the Dutch artist Johan Barthold Jongkind. Executed in oils on canvas, the painting is currently in the collection of the Metropolitan Museum of Art.

Description 
The painting depicts the Quai d'Orsay on the left bank of the River Seine. In line with some of his earlier works, Jongkind rendered the Seine to be a place of industrial activity; as such, cranes, barges, rowboats, and pack animals occupy a prominent role in the painting. Further down the river, large Parisian structures can be seen, while a lightly clouded sky hangs above the river.

References 

1854 paintings
Paintings in the collection of the Metropolitan Museum of Art
Dutch paintings
Maritime paintings